Highway 362, also known as the Pilot Butte access road, is an unsigned highway in the Canadian province of Saskatchewan. It runs from the Trans-Canada Highway (Highway 1) to Highway 46 along the western edge of Pilot Butte.

The intersection of Highway 362 and Highway 1 is the site of a diverging diamond interchange as part of the Regina Bypass project.

References 

363
Pilot Butte, Saskatchewan